Dániel Kiss (born 12 February 1982) is a Hungarian hurdler. He holds the national record in the indoor sprint hurdle event.

He finished 7th in the 110 m hurdles final at the 2006 European Athletics Championships in Gothenburg. 
In 2010 he reached the final at the World Indoor Championships, where he placed 8th.

Competition record

Personal bests

Awards
 Hungarian athlete of the Year (1): 2010

References

External links

1982 births
Living people
Hungarian male hurdlers
Athletes (track and field) at the 2008 Summer Olympics
Athletes (track and field) at the 2012 Summer Olympics
Olympic athletes of Hungary
European Athletics Championships medalists
University of Memphis alumni
Athletes from Budapest